Velichkovo is a village located in Dalgopol Municipality, in Varna Province, eastern Bulgaria.

References

Villages in Varna Province